Szymanów is a village in the administrative district of Gmina Dobromierz, within Świdnica County, Lower Silesian Voivodeship, in south-western Poland.

Gallery

References

Villages in Świdnica County